Sergei Piskunov (born March 11, 1981) is a Russian professional ice hockey winger who currently plays for HC Donbass of the Russian Major League (VHL).

References

External links

Living people
Amur Khabarovsk players
1981 births
HC Donbass players
Russian ice hockey left wingers
People from Magnitogorsk
Sportspeople from Chelyabinsk Oblast